The 2023 Campeonato Brasileiro Série A will be the 67th season of the Campeonato Brasileiro Série A, the top level of professional football in Brazil, and the 20th edition in a double round-robin since its establishment in 2003. The competition will begin on 15 April and will end on 3 December 2023.

The top six teams as well as the 2023 Copa do Brasil champions will qualify for the Copa Libertadores. The next six best-placed teams not qualified for Copa Libertadores will qualify for the Copa Sudamericana and the last four will be relegated to Série B for 2024.

Palmeiras are the defending champions.

Teams
Twenty teams will compete in the league – the top sixteen teams from the previous season, as well as four teams promoted from the Série B.

Cruzeiro became the first club to be promoted on 21 September 2022 after a 3–0 win against Vasco da Gama. Grêmio were promoted on 23 October 2022, and Bahia and Vasco da Gama were promoted on 6 November 2022.

Number of teams by state

Stadiums and locations

Personnel and kits

Managerial changes

Notes

Foreign players
The clubs can have a maximum of seven foreign players in their Campeonato Brasileiro squads per match, but there is no limit of foreigners in the clubs' squads.

Players holding Brazilian dual nationality
They do not take foreign slot.

  Cicinho (Bahia)
  Júnior Moraes (Corinthians)
  Johnny Cardoso (Internacional)
  Mário Fernandes (Internacional)
  André Anderson (São Paulo)
  João Moreira (São Paulo)
  Marcos Paulo (São Paulo)

Standings

League table

Positions by round
The table lists the positions of teams after each week of matches.In order to preserve chronological evolvements, any postponed matches are not included to the round at which they were originally scheduled, but added to the full round they were played immediately afterwards.

Results

References

2023 in Brazilian football
Brazil
Campeonato Brasileiro Série A seasons
2023 in Brazilian football leagues